is a 2015 Japanese film directed by Takahiro Miki and based on the manga by Taishi Mori which is itself based on the novel by Eiichi Nakata. It was released on February 28, 2015.

Plot
Yuri Kashiwagi, a beautiful and talented pianist suddenly returns to her hometown in Goto Islands. She relieves her friend Haruko, who is on maternity leave, as the advisor for the school chorus. The choir aims to take part in NCon, a choir contest organised by Japanese national broadcaster NHK. However, her arrival attracts many male members to the choir. This creates friction within the previously all-female choir.

Cast
 Yui Aragaki as Yuri Kashiwagi
 Fumino Kimura as Haruko Matsuyama
 Kenta Kiritani as Tetsuo Tsukamoto
 Hikari Ishida
 Tae Kimura
 Hisashi Igawa
 Yuri Tsunematsu
 Shota Shimoda
 Wakana Aoi
 Kyoka Shibata
 Mayu Yamaguchi
 Hayato Sano
 Hibiki Muroi

References

External links
 

2010s Japanese films
2015 films
Live-action films based on manga
Films based on Japanese novels
Films directed by Takahiro Miki
Films based on adaptations